Daphne is an unincorporated community in Franklin County, Texas, United States.

History
The area in what is known as Daphne today was first settled in the 1850s. A post office was established at Daphne in 1895 and remained in operation until 1906, with mail being delivered to the community via special supply from Mount Vernon. All that remained in the community was a community center and several scattered houses in 1985.

Geography

Education
Today, the community is served by the Mount Vernon Independent School District.

References

Unincorporated communities in Franklin County, Texas
Unincorporated communities in Texas